General Motors operates several proving grounds.

North America

Desert Proving Ground Yuma

Desert Proving Ground Yuma is a facility co-built and leased by General Motors located within the US Army's Yuma Proving Ground, near Yuma, Arizona. The facility came fully online as of July 2009. One of the main reasons that this site was chosen was the already imposed no fly zone which helps prevent unwanted photography of pre-production prototypes undergoing testing. The facility is also used by the US Army for their own testing requirements.

Other such features are:

  circle track (3 lanes)
  straight track (2–3 lanes)
  Ride Road (2–4 lanes)
  Dynamics Pad
 Interior Noise Road
 Noise Pass-by Facility
 Misc. grades
  main building
 Garage (40 hoists)
 Office (120 residents/visitors)
 Product Electronics/Instrumentation Lab
 Alignment/Tire facilities
 Transmission Build Room
 Machine/Fab shop
 Parts Crib
 Warehouse 
 Sundrella (40 hoists)
 Covered parking
 Fuel facility
 Car wash
 Scale House / Ballast Station

Milford Proving Ground

The General Motors Milford Proving Ground was the industry's first dedicated automobile testing facility when it opened in 1924. Some roads are open only to drivers who have passed special performance driving training.

 Facilities

 The VDTA ("Vehicle Dynamics Test Area"), also known as "Black Lake", is a  pad of blacktop for vehicle dynamics testing. Waterfowl have been known to try to land on this "lake" of asphalt. At the ends of the VDTA are two semicircle tracks used for accelerating vehicles up to high speed before entering the pad. A controlled low-friction area made of ceramic tiles is on one side of the pad. Another area is coated with the asphalt sealant Jennite and can be watered down to produce a low friction surface.
 The Oval Track is a  circuit
 The Circle Track encloses the VDTA and is a  banked circle. It has five lanes posted with speed limits increasing towards the outermost lane. The speed limit for the outermost lane is 100+ MPH (192  km/h). Due to the banking, each lane can be driven at its posted speed all the way around the circle without needing to touch the steering wheel, given proper wheel alignment and tire pressures. The track surface is extremely hard "dolomite" concrete for wear resistance.
 The East/West Straightaway is  around and includes two 1.2 mi (1.9 km) straightaways
 "Seven Sisters" is a short course featuring seven tight curves, some level, some banked. It is one lane that can be driven in both directions, so only one car is allowed on the course at a time. This is used for testing vehicles under transient lateral acceleration loads.
 12 Mile Road is a straight section of pavement which duplicates the historical surface texture of a section of 12 Mile Road near Detroit.
 The Ride and Handling loop is enclosed by the Circle Track and has varied surfaces and turns.
 The Vehicle Safety & Crashworthiness Lab includes a recently added rollover test facility.

Cupuán Proving Ground 

General Motors Proving Ground Cupuan del Rio is situated between Lázaro Cárdenas and Uruapan, Michoacán, Mexico. The facility opened in 2006 and features a circle track, several off-road courses, and is primarily used for testing HVAC systems.

As of 2011 the grounds are mostly abandoned, and only a local security staff remains. This is due to the volatile, potentially unsafe situation in the region and the access routes to/from Cupuán.

South America

Cruz Alta Proving Ground, Brazil

General Motors Cruz Alta Proving Ground at Indaiatuba, Brazil 
 Founded in 1974
 Proving Ground facilities
 It is the largest and most comprehensive proving ground in Latin America, and the second largest in the General Motors Corporation. It comprises the most advanced test tracks, which precisely replicate the most varied and demanding road conditions. 
 GM do Brasil is committed to the preservation of forests and the animal species that live there. In addition, GM do Brasil recently partnered with IBAMA, the Brazilian Environment Protection Agency, to monitor the abundant proliferation of capybaras at that location.

Europe

Testzentrum Dudenhofen

Opel operates a proving ground near Dudenhofen, Germany , opened in 1964.

Arjeplog

Opel operates a winter climate proving ground near Arjeplog, Sweden. Most of the tracks are on the lake ice.

Australia

Lang Lang Proving Ground

It was opened in 1957 by Holden on a  site off the Bass Highway. It was used to test every Holden model from the Holden FC onwards. It is also equipped with an Emissions Laboratory and Safety Test Facility with crash barrier and HYGE sled.

In February 2020 GM announced the test track and design centre would close with all jobs being redundant to reflect the GM decision to quit global right hand drive vehicle production. In September 2020, it was sold to VinFast. It will continue to be used by GM Specialty Vehicles. In October 2021, VinFast disbanded its local engineering operations and put the Lang Lang Proving Ground test track up for sale. Its official website is llpg.com.au

Asia

Guangde County, Anhui, China

Shanghai GM (SGM) and Pan Asia Technical Automotive Center (PATAC), both joint-ventures of SAIC Motor with GM China, opened in September 2012 China's largest proving ground in Guangde County, Anhui, China.

Proposed / Closed Proving Grounds Facilities

Mezcala Proving Ground

GM's proposed facility at Mezcala, Mexico was terminated in the planning phase due to breakdown in land negotiations. The facility was to take over Desert Proving Ground tasks when GM announced DPG's closing in 2000. DPG is still operating as of late 2008. Soon to be closed and replaced with the new facility in Yuma, Arizona.

Desert (Mesa) Proving Ground

GM Desert Proving Ground in Mesa, Arizona, USA was a General Motors facility for the testing of HVAC, propulsion, and various automotive systems in a harsh climate. Opened in 1953, the closure of this facility was completed in 2009. It was replaced by a new facility in Yuma, Arizona, known as the Desert Proving Ground Yuma.

See also 

 Nardò Ring
 Ehra-Lessien (Volkswagen)
 Fiorano Circuit (Ferrari)
 Ford Proving Grounds
 Mazda Proving Grounds
 Nissan Proving Grounds

References

External links

Opel Test Center Dudenhofen
Nevada Automotive Proving Ground

Buildings and structures in Mesa, Arizona
Buildings and structures in Oakland County, Michigan
Buildings and structures in Yuma County, Arizona
General Motors facilities
Road test tracks by manufacturer
1924 establishments in Michigan